The Women's Slalom in the 2023 FIS Alpine Skiing World Cup is currently scheduled to consist of eleven events, including the final. The original schedule also called for eleven events, but a night slalom at Zagreb on 5 January was cancelled due to high winds and warm weather and not immediately rescheduled. However, a week later (12 January), the race was rescheduled as a second slalom at Špindlerův Mlýn on 28 January, accompanied by a shift of the giant slalom scheduled there that day to Kronplatz on 25 January. 

The season was interrupted by the 2023 World Ski Championships in the linked resorts of Courchevel and Méribel, France from 6–19 February 2023. Although the Alpine Skiing branch of the International Ski Federation (FIS) conducts both the World Cup and the World Championships, the World Championships are organized by nation (a maximum of four skiers is generally permitted per nation), and (after 1970) the results count only for World Championship medals, not for World Cup points. Accordingly, the results in the World Championship are highlighted in blue and shown in this table by ordinal position only in each discipline. The women's slalom was held in Méribel on 18 February.

Season Summary
After setting an all-time World Cup record by finishing in the top 3 in a discipline 30 times without ever recording a race win in that discipline, Wendy Holdener of Switzerland won both the third and fourth slaloms of the year to finally end that streak.

However, after the first 8 races, Mikaela Shiffrin of the United States, who had won five of them and finished second in two others, led the season standings by 175 points. Holdener was in second place, and defending discipline champion Petra Vlhová of Slovakia was 20 points further back in third.  In the ninth race, Shiffrin finished second by 0.06 seconds, but she clinched the season title in the discipline with a 255-point lead over Holdener and Vlhová with just two races to go. In the next slalom at Åre, Sweden, Shiffrin's victory was her 87th World Cup victory, surpassing the all-time record of 86 set by Swedish technical specialist Ingemar Stenmark in the 1970s-1980s.. Meanwhile, Holdener held off Vhlová by 25 points to claim second.

The World Cup finals in women's slalom took place on Saturday, 18 March 2023, in Soldeu, Andorra, which previously hosted the finals in 2019. Only the top 25 skiers in the World Cup slalom discipline and the winner of the Junior World Championship, plus any skiers who have scored at least 500 points in the World Cup overall classification for the season, were eligible to compete in the final, and only the top 15 earned World Cup points.

Standings

Legend

DNQ = Did Not Qualify for run 2
DNF1 = Did Not Finish run 1
DSQ1 = Disqualified run 1
DNF2 = Did Not Finish run 2
DSQ2 = Disqualified run 2
DNS2 = Did Not Start run 2

See also
 2023 Alpine Skiing World Cup – Women's summary rankings
 2023 Alpine Skiing World Cup – Women's Overall
 2023 Alpine Skiing World Cup – Women's Downhill
 2023 Alpine Skiing World Cup – Women's Super-G
 2023 Alpine Skiing World Cup – Women's Giant Slalom
 World Cup scoring system

References

External links
 Alpine Skiing at FIS website

Women's slalom
FIS Alpine Ski World Cup slalom women's discipline titles